Wettolsheim is a commune in the Haut-Rhin department in Grand Est in north-eastern France.

It is situated at the eastern margin of the southern Vosges Mountains. The commune is part of the Parc naturel régional des Ballons des Vosges.

Places of interest

Grotte de Lourdes grandeur réelle: In 1912, after the destruction of the house of his birth by a fire, arch bishop François-Xavier Schoepfer (1843–1927), bishop of Tarbes and Lourdes from 1899 until 1927, decided to let build an exact copy of the grotto Massabielle in Lourdes at the same place where the house stood. The statue of the Virgin Mary was placed on a stone coming from the site where St. Bernadette Soubirous first saw the Immaculate Conception in 1858. The cavern in the heart of the village is still a place for a lot of religious ceremonies.

Population

See also
 Communes of the Haut-Rhin department

References

Communes of Haut-Rhin